Micromenodon is an extinct genus of sphenodontian from the Late Triassic Doswell Formation of Virginia. It contains a single species, Micromenodon pitti.

References 

Sphenodontia
Triassic species
Triassic reptiles
Triassic reptiles of North America
Fossil taxa described in 2021